Alexandru Florin Zotincă (born 22 January 1977 in Sibiu) is a Romanian-American former football defender and current youth coach. His older brother, Dorin was also a footballer.

Career
Zotinca began his career with FC Inter Sibiu, where he played from 1995 to 1998.  In 1998, he moved to Steaua București, where he would play from 1998 to 2000, and with whom he would appear in the UEFA Cup.

In 2000, Zotinca won a United States Green Card in an immigration lottery, and left Romania for America.  He played for four years for the Kansas City Comets of the MISL, being named to the All-Rookie team in 2000–01, and the All-Star team in 2002–03.  Near the beginning of the 2003 MLS season, Zotinca was signed by the Wizards.  He did well in his first year, starting 14 games and playing 1239 minutes in a variety of positions for the Wizards.  In 2004, Zotinca firmly established himself at the right back position, and played most of the team's minutes there, appearing in 25 games and playing 1779 minutes.  He played a similarly important role during the next two seasons, but failed to sign a new contract with the team for the 2007 season and was traded to Chivas USA.  Zotinca started 20 games for the club during 2007, but played a diminished role in the next season, starting only 4 games, and was waived by Chivas USA on 28 November 2008.

After a two-year layoff from professional football, Zotincă was re-signed by Chivas USA on 4 June 2010 to strengthen their defensive unit.

After the 2010 MLS season Chivas USA declined Zotincă's contract option and Zotincă elected to participate in the 2010 MLS Re-Entry Draft. Zotincă became a free agent in Major League Soccer when he was not selected in the Re-Entry draft.

Coaching career 
After the end of his career was part of the Chivas USA Youth team coaching staff. Since 14 December 2011 worked as Head coach by United Futebol Club in San Juan Capistrano.

Honours

Club
 Steaua Bucharest
Romanian Cup: 1998–99
 Gaz Metan Mediaș
Liga II: 1999–00
 Sporting Kansas City
Lamar Hunt U.S. Open Cup: 2004
MLS (Western Conference Championship): 2004

Individual
MISL All-Rookie team: 2001
MISL Al-Star: 2003

References

External links
 
 
 Alex Zotincă at JustSportsStats.com
 
 

1977 births
Living people
Sportspeople from Sibiu
Romanian footballers
Liga I players
Liga II players
FC Inter Sibiu players
CS Gaz Metan Mediaș players
FC Steaua București players
Romanian emigrants to the United States
Romanian expatriate footballers
Sporting Kansas City players
Chivas USA players
Major League Soccer players
National Professional Soccer League (1984–2001) players
Major Indoor Soccer League (2001–2008) players
Kansas City Comets (2001–2005 MISL) players
Romanian expatriate sportspeople in the United States
Expatriate soccer players in the United States
Association football defenders